F.C. Elmstead is a semi-professional football club based in Elmstead, London, England.

History
The club was founded as Elmstead Rovers on 13 October 1958 at a meeting at 74 The Avenue in Chislehurst, and were initially a Sunday league club. In 1964 the club adopted its current name, with the mid-1960s also seeing the club change its colours of claret and blue to scarlet and blue after the kit was accidentally boil-washed, changing the colour.

In 2013 the club switched from the Metropolitan Sunday League to playing Saturday football and joined Division Three West of the Kent County League. After finishing as runners-up in their first season in the division, they were promoted to Division Two West. The following season saw them finish as Division Two West runners-up, earning promotion to the Kent Invicta League. In 2016 the Kent Invicta League merged into the Southern Counties East League, becoming its Division One.

Ground
The club played at the Chislehurst Recreation Ground from their establishment in 1958 until joining the Kent County League in 2013, when they started groundsharing at Tiepigs Lane in Coney Hall. After moving up to the Kent Invicta League, they moved to Holmesdale's Oakley Road ground in Bromley. Since the summer of 2018, they have been playing at Sutton Athletic's Lower Road ground in Hextable.

Records
Best FA Vase performance: First round, 2016–17

See also
F.C. Elmstead players

References

External links

Football clubs in England
Football clubs in London
Association football clubs established in 1958
1958 establishments in England
Kent County League
Kent Invicta Football League
Southern Counties East Football League
Sport in the London Borough of Bromley